Cayman Islands English is an English variety spoken in the Cayman Islands. While not much has been written on Cayman Islands English, according to one text, it "seems to have borrowed creole features similar to Jamaica and Central America without having undergone creolization". It is similar to Bay Islands English.

References

External links 
 

Languages of the Cayman Islands
Caymanian culture
Caribbean English
English-based pidgins and creoles
Languages of the United Kingdom
Languages of the African diaspora